The 2019–20 DePaul Blue Demons women's basketball team represented DePaul University during the 2019–20 NCAA Division I women's basketball season. The Blue Demons, led by thirty-fourth year head coach Doug Bruno, played their home games at the Wintrust Arena and the McGrath-Phillips Arena as members of the Big East Conference. They finished the season 28–5, 15–3 in Big East play to finish in first place. DePaul won the Big East Conference tournament championship game over Marquette, 88–74.  The NCAA tournament was cancelled due to the COVID-19 outbreak.

Previous season
They finished the season 26–8, 14–4 in Big East play to finish in second place.  DePaul won the Big East Conference tournament championship game over Marquette, 74–73. They were upset in the first round by Missouri State in the NCAA women's tournament.

Roster

Schedule

|-
!colspan=9 style=| Exhibition

|-
!colspan=9 style=| Non-conference regular season

|-
!colspan=9 style=| Big East regular season

|-
!colspan=9 style=| Big East Women's Tournament

Rankings

^Coaches' Poll did not release a second poll at the same time as the AP.

See also
2019–20 DePaul Blue Demons men's basketball team

References

DePaul
DePaul Blue Demons women's basketball seasons
Depaul
Depaul